Robert Offley Ashburton Crewe-Milnes, 1st Marquess of Crewe,  (12 January 185820 June 1945), known as The Honourable Robert Milnes from 1863 to 1885, The Lord Houghton from 1885 to 1895 and as The Earl of Crewe from 1895 to 1911, was a British Liberal politician, statesman and writer.

Early life
Robert Offley Ashburton Milnes was born at 16 Upper Brook Street, Mayfair, London, the only son of Richard Monckton Milnes, 1st Baron Houghton, by his wife the Hon. Annabella Crewe, daughter of John Crewe, 2nd Baron Crewe, and was educated firstly at Winton House, near Winchester, and then Harrow. He went up to Trinity College, Cambridge, graduating in 1880.

Political career
A Liberal in politics, Milnes became Assistant Private Secretary to Lord Granville in April 1883 when Granville was Secretary of State for Foreign Affairs. In an 1884 by-election he was the losing Liberal candidate at Barnsley. As Baron Houghton, he was made Liberal whip in 1885. In January 1886 he was made a Lord-in-waiting to Queen Victoria during the Third Gladstone ministry, and remained a Home Ruler.

Prepared for ministerial success, a severe blow was struck to a burgeoning political career: his wife Sybil Marcia, daughter of Sir Frederick Ulric Graham, 3rd Baronet of Netherby, whom he had married on 3 June 1880, died suddenly in September 1887, still only thirty years old. He was determined to get over this personal tragedy by studying agriculture at Cirencester. However, he was prevented by illness from pursuing his studies. Leaving England, he travelled to Egypt where the Stray Verses were written in a somewhat mournful lament at his great loss. Further melancholy hit hard when his eight-year-old son and heir Richard died in 1890.

Returning to Houghton in 1892, he was Lord Lieutenant of Ireland in the Liberal Government of 1892–1895, in which his old friend Lord Rosebery eventually became Prime Minister. John Morley served as Chief Secretary.

On the death of his uncle, Hungerford Crewe, 3rd Baron Crewe, he inherited vast estates of nearly 50,000 acres in four counties, and assumed the same year the additional surname of Crewe by royal licence on 8 June 1894. On 17 July 1895 he was created Earl of Crewe, in the County Palatine of Chester.

On 20 April 1899, he married an eighteen-year-old society beauty, Lady Margaret Etrenne Hannah Primrose, daughter of the former Prime Minister Lord Rosebery.

The Second Boer War broke out only months later in October. Crewe remained a leader of the conciliators who to the last tried to find a negotiated settlement with President Kruger. He began to grow apart from his father-in-law's Liberal imperialism, advocating a gradualist "step-by-step" policy of containment of the situation. But the war soon escalated with Crewe finding himself isolated. He was not much of an orator, but had skills in administration, proving an efficient organizer. He became increasingly influential with Henry Campbell-Bannerman and the Radicals. He made a personal friend out of H. H. Asquith, who was his political mainstay in the round of intrigues that intensified during the lead-up to the First World War. A close confidante he was appointed as an aide on almost every committee. From 1905 to 1908 he was Lord President of the Council in the Liberal government. The Lords, dominated by Tory Peers, were hostile to Asquith's proposed reforms. They wrecked the Education Bill of 1906, while Crewe stood out as the main defender of the Cabinet's policy. In response to pleas from Campbell-Bannerman, he assumed the role of cross-party convenor. Crewe was moderate in all things. He deplored Lloyd George's Limehouse Speech in the east end of London in support of the People's Budget. By the same token, he found it unacceptable for die-hard Tories and Unionists to continue to block legislation.

Although Elgin reassured him of Winston Churchill's friendliness among Liberals, Crewe was in for a rude shock: he had succeeded the orientalist Lord Elgin as Secretary of State for the Colonies, and in May 1908 he had an angry exchange of letters with Churchill who had intervened in a colonial debate in the Commons. Crewe could be haughty and coldly disapproving: alike to Grey he took a dim view of Lloyd George's People's Budget. It was Crewe's job to steer it through the Lords. In his capacity as Leader of the House of Lords he played a key role in bringing the Parliament Act 1911 (depriving the Lords of its veto) to the floor of the house and eventually onto the statute book. Asquith valued him highly as a colleague, for his common sense and sound judgment rather than any exceptional brilliance. But when Churchill circulated a memorandum proposing the abolition of the Lords in 1910, Crewe remained essentially whiggish and cautious, blocking any attempt to change the bicameral relationship. He sat on the Constitutional Conference Commission set up on 16 June 1910 during the crisis following Edward VII's death.  The inconclusive outcome of the January 1910 election, which increased Unionist representation in the Commons, caused a wide-ranging debate on the constitutional implications of the Lords' powers.  The new King, George V, to obviate a stalemate agreed to create 500 new peers, should the Liberals win the December 1910 election.  Crewe was present at the discussions as one of the Inner Sanctum in the cabinet. He had previously taken a more right-wing position with Asquith arguing for reform of the membership of the Upper House, rather than of its customary powers. Crewe was selected to face leading Tory Lord Cromer, and the Archbishop of Canterbury, in negotiation of the provisions of the Veto bill, which would give a whip hand to an elected Commons.

It was his colonial responsibilities from September 1910 as part of his terms as Secretary of State for India (1910–11 and 1911–15), for which he gained the hoped-for promotion in the peerage. The Delhi Durbar was an invention of his genius for organization, designed to the last detail for the first British monarch in history to pay a visit to India. In that post, he was responsible for the removal of the capital of India from Calcutta to Delhi, and the reunion of the two Bengals under a Governor-in-Council, as well as commissioning the architect, Sir Edwin Lutyens for his outstanding visionary grand design of New Delhi. He was further honoured in 1911 when he was created Earl of Madeley and Marquess of Crewe.

In at least one of Asquith's cabinet lists 1913–14, Crewe was at the top; but other ministers, like Churchill, were more thrusting at pushing themselves forward for promotion. Crewe was widely respected for his administrative competence, efficiency and personal intelligence. Crewe served as Lord President of the Council again from May 1915, coming second in Asquith's rankings and working closely with Lloyd George on currency and exchange rate stabilisation in the budget. His home at Crewe House, Curzon Street in Mayfair became a centre for war propaganda.

In 1916 he was appointed briefly as President of the Board of Education, and may have been useful in the post-war educational sector, but the coalition split in December. He remained as ever, an Asquithian, declining office under Lloyd George, and after his resignation, he continued to lead the independent Liberal opposition in the House of Lords. He took the largely  honorific title of Chairman of London County Council. He maintained a leading role in the education sector, serving as Chairman of the Governing Body of Imperial College London (1907–22), and Chancellor of Sheffield University. He was later Ambassador to France appointed by Bonar Law from October (1922–28). As Ambassador to France, he launched a fund for the creation of a British Institute in Paris, which has since developed into the University of London Institute in Paris (ULIP). He had a very brief ten-week stint as Secretary for War in MacDonald's National Coalition from August 1931, but did not hold office after the general election. The Samuelite Liberals withdrew over free trade from the National Coalition in 1932. From 1936 and throughout the Second World War Crewe was leader of the Independent Liberals in the House of Lords.  He served as Lord High Constable of England for the coronation of King George VI and Queen Elizabeth.

Public-speaker 
He did not much like public speaking, but that was probably because he contrasted sharply with Lloyd George's firebrand delivery and populist demagogy. Crewe himself tended to hesitate too long time with "pregnant pauses", as his speech became stilted. He was above all fastidious in the royal tradition of Charles I. Edwin Montagu claimed, somewhat sardonically, that one of his female constituents died of boredom listening to the Marquess. His father-in-law, Lord Rosebery, had been Liberal Leader six years before he himself became Leader in the House of Lords of that party. Rosebery thought Crewe a reliable politician but a poor speaker. When it was announced to him that his daughter, the Marchioness of Crewe, was in labour, Rosebery is said to have quipped "I hope that her delivery is not as slow as Crewe's". Always at ease in London High Society, Crewe hosted the dinner party at which Winston Churchill met Clementine Hozier.

Political positions 

Crewe voiced his support during his time in Parliament for numerous reforms, including old-age pensions, an eight-hour day for miners, and meal provisions for schoolchildren. In November 1905, Crewe had written to (then) Party leader Henry Campbell-Bannerman of the need for innovative reform on the part of the Liberals, noting that

More than ever before, the Liberal Party is on its trial as an engine for securing social reforms, - taxation, land, housing, etc. It has to resist the I.L.P. claim to be the only friend of the workers. Can it do this and attempt Home Rule as well?

During the Liberal party crises of 1886, 1909–11, and 1916, he stayed loyal to the party. He was also said to have acknowledged the damage the First World War did to liberalism.  When he died the 4th Marquess of Salisbury described Crewe as "the best of the whig statesmen". One historian believed his whiggery was more temperamental than ideological.  Reserved and stiff upper-lipped by nature he sought compromise by mediation attempting to negotiate a middle way. His meetings were often spontaneous and informal, but dominated by an aristocratic clique: Lloyd George recalled how in 1912 Crewe had tried at Deeside to resolve Ulster's longstanding problems with Bonar Law over a round of golf.

Literary work
Crewe inherited his father's literary tastes, and published for public consumption Stray Verses in 1890, besides other miscellaneous literary work, including Gleanings from Béranger (privately printed in 1889), much of which he translated. A war poem, A Harrow Grave in Flanders—which touches on the theme of "what might have been"—was published in several anthologies during and following World War I. Lord Crewe was the last of the Liberal grandees at the end of Empire.  He was essentially by character a Victorian, and this showed in his austere reverential writings that took few risks with the material.

Soon after the death of his father-in-law the 5th Earl of Rosebery in 1929, the family asked Crewe to write his biography. The two-volume Lord Rosebery  was published by John Murray in 1931. Crewe's dedication reads "To my wife - this attempt to tell the story of one we both loved".

Death
Crewe died on 20 June 1945 at the age of 87. His body was buried in the graveyard of Saint Bertoline's Church in the Cheshire village of Barthomley. As he had no surviving male heir, both his sons (one from each marriage) having died in childhood, his titles became extinct upon his death.

Family

Crewe married twice. In 1880, he married Sibyl Marcia Graham (1857–1887), daughter of Sir Frederick Graham, 3rd Baronet, of Netherby in the County of Cumberland. They had three daughters and one son, who died as a child:
 Lady Annabel Crewe-Milnes (1881–1948). She married twice. In 1903, she married Arthur O'Neill (1876–1914), later Ulster Unionist MP for Mid Antrim. Their third son, Terence O'Neill, was to become Prime Minister of Northern Ireland. Her second marriage was to Hugh Dodds to whom she bore two sons, the writer Quentin Crewe and Colin Crewe.
 Hon. Richard Charles Rodes Milnes (1882–1890), died in childhood.
 Lady Celia Hermione Crewe-Milnes (1884–1985), twin with her sister Cynthia. She married Sir Edward Clive Milnes-Coates, 2nd Baronet.
 Lady Helen Cynthia Crewe-Milnes, Mrs Colville, DBE (1884–1968). Twin with her sister, Celia. She married the Hon. George Charles Colville (1867–1943) and was mother of Sir John Colville who served as a Private Secretary to Neville Chamberlain, Winston Churchill and Clement Attlee.

In 1899, more than a decade after his first wife's death, the 41-year-old Crewe married again. At eighteen years of age, the bride was around the same age as Crewe's eldest daughter. She was Lady Margaret Etrenne Hannah  Primrose, daughter of the 5th Earl of Rosebery. As Lady Crewe, she became one of the first seven women appointed as magistrates in 1919 following the passing of the Sex Disqualification (Removal) Act 1919. They had two children, a son and a daughter, and again the son died in childhood. The children were:

 Richard George Archibald John Lucian Hungerford Crewe-Milnes, Earl of Madeley (1911–1922),
 Lady Mary Evelyn Hungerford Crewe-Milnes (1915–2014), first wife of the 9th Duke of Roxburghe.

Notes

References

External links

"Milnes, Robert Offley Ashburton Crewe", Oxford Dictionary of National Biography.

 

1858 births
1945 deaths
Alumni of Trinity College, Cambridge
British Secretaries of State
Members of the Privy Council of the United Kingdom
Secretaries of State for the Colonies
Secretaries of State for India
British Secretaries of State for Education
Secretaries of State for War (UK)
Garter Knights appointed by Edward VII
Lord High Constables of England
Lord-Lieutenants of the County of London
Lord Presidents of the Council
Lords Lieutenant of Ireland
Lords Privy Seal
Marquesses in the Peerage of the United Kingdom
Liberal Party (UK) hereditary peers
Members of London County Council
People associated with Imperial College London
People associated with the University of Sheffield
Diplomatic peers
Presidents of the Girls' Day School Trust
Presidents of the Royal Society of Literature
Fellows of the Society of Antiquaries of London
British racehorse owners and breeders
Ambassadors of the United Kingdom to France
Leaders of the House of Lords
Eldest sons of British hereditary barons
Barons Houghton
Peers of the United Kingdom created by Queen Victoria
Peers created by George V
People educated at Harrow School
Presidents of the Classical Association